Johnson County Courthouse, also known as Old Johnson County Courthouse, is a historic courthouse located at Warrensburg, Johnson County, Missouri. It was built between 1838 and 1841, and is a two-story, Federal style stuccoed brick building.  It has a hipped roof and simple cornice.  It was replaced by the Johnson County Courthouse on Courthouse Square.  The building houses the Johnson County Historical Society.

It was listed on the National Register of Historic Places in 1970.

References

County courthouses in Missouri
History museums in Missouri
Courthouses on the National Register of Historic Places in Missouri
Federal architecture in Missouri
Government buildings completed in 1841
Buildings and structures in Johnson County, Missouri
National Register of Historic Places in Johnson County, Missouri